Andrew Hamilton may refer to:

 Andrew Hamilton (footballer, born 1882) (1882–1915), Scottish footballer
 Andrew Hamilton (footballer, born 1873) (1873–1929), Scottish footballer
 Andrew Hamilton (New Jersey governor) (died 1703), colonial governor of New Jersey
 Andrew Hamilton (lawyer) (1676–1741), attorney for John Peter Zenger in libel case, and Pennsylvania Attorney General
 Andrew Jackson Hamilton (1815–1875), US congressman and provisional governor of Texas
 Andrew H. Hamilton (1834–1895), US congressman
 Andrew D. Hamilton (born 1952), British chemist, President of New York University, and former Vice-Chancellor of the University of Oxford
 Andrew Hamilton (rugby league) (born 1971), Australian rugby league player
 Andrew Hamilton (canoeist), British canoeist
 Andrew Hamilton (priest) (died 1754), Anglican priest in Ireland
 Andrew Hamilton, Lord Redhouse (c.1565–1634), Scottish landowner and Senator of the College of Justice.

Andy Hamilton may refer to:

 Andy Hamilton (born 1954), British entertainer
 Andy Hamilton (jazz saxophonist) (1918–2012), Jamaican-born British jazz saxophonist
 Andy Hamilton (American football) (born 1950), American football player
 Andy Hamilton (pop saxophonist) (born 1953), British pop saxophonist
 Andy Hamilton (darts player) (born 1967), British darts player
 Andy Hamilton (author) (born 1974), British author